Compass Bank Building is the former name of buildings in the United States in which Compass Bancshares was a tenant:

Daniel Building, Birmingham, Alabama
Compass Bank Building (Albuquerque), New Mexico